Lewis Oscar "Bull" Smith (August 20, 1880 – May 1, 1928) was a Major League Baseball outfielder.   He played from 1904 to 1911 for the Chicago Cubs, Pittsburgh Pirates, and Washington Senators.  In 1911 Bull was asked to “teach the finer points of the game” as a coach for the Washington Senators. Bull was given an official at-bat for the big club for his services. He took a walk. Smith attended West Virginia University, where he played four seasons (1900–1903) of college baseball for the Mountaineers.

Outside of baseball, Smith played football in 1905 for the Canton Athletic Club.  He remained with the team in 1906 as they were renamed the Canton Bulldogs. Smith and Canton played in the "Ohio League", which was the direct predecessor to the National Football League.  Smith played halfback for the Bulldogs in 1906 when a betting scandal involving Canton and their rival, the Massillon Tigers, arose.

Head coaching record

References

External links

 
 https://bullthemovie.wordpress.com/2012/06/04/bull-a-real-players-timeline-1911-1924/

1880 births
1928 deaths
American football halfbacks
Major League Baseball outfielders
Chicago Cubs players
Pittsburgh Pirates players
Washington Senators (1901–1960) players
Canton Bulldogs (Ohio League) players
Canton Athletic Club players
Minor league baseball managers
West Virginia Mountaineers baseball players
West Virginia Wesleyan Bobcats football coaches
Wheeling Stogies players
Coaches of American football from West Virginia
Players of American football from West Virginia
Baseball players from West Virginia